Blue emperor may refer to
 Anax imperator, a hawker dragonfly found in Europe and nearby Africa and Asia
 Papilio ulysses, a metallic blue butterfly endemic to New Guinea
 Qīngdì (青帝 "Blue Emperor"), the east and spring aspect of the Wufang Shangdi

Animal common name disambiguation pages